Kirby is a given name, and may refer to:

 Kirby Ian Andersen, Canadian musician
 Kirby Ann Basken (born 1985), Norwegian model
 Kirby Bentley (born 1986), Australian rules footballer
 Kirby Bliss Blanton (born 1990), American actress
 Kirby Chambliss (born 1959), American pilot
 Kirby Dach (born 2001), Canadian ice hockey player
 Kirby Dick (born 1952), American filmmaker
 Kirby Lauryen Dockery, American singer-songwriter
 Kirby Doyle (1932–2003), American poet
 Kirby Freeman (born 1985), American football player
 Kirby Grant (1911–1985), American actor
 Kirby Gregory (born 1953), British musician
 Kirby J. Hensley (1911–1999), American religious leader
 Kirby Heyborne (born 1976), American actor
 Kirby Higbe (1915–1985), American right-handed starting pitcher
 Kirby Hocutt (born 1973), American sports director
 Kirby Howell-Baptiste, English actress
 Kirby Larson, American writer
 Kirby Law (born 1977), Canadian ice hockey player
 Kirby Mack (born 1983), American wrestler
 Kirby Morrow (born 1973-2020), Canadian performer
 Kirby Puckett (1960–2006), American baseball player
 Kirby Smart (born 1975), American football coach
 Kirby Smith (1824–1893), American army officer and professor
 Kirby Snead (born 1994), American baseball player
 Kirby Wilson (born 1961), American football coach
 Kirby Wright, American writer
 Kirby Yates (born 1987), American baseball player

See also 
 Kirby (disambiguation)
 

Lists of people by given name